The 1973 Pacific Coast Open – Doubles was an event of the 1973 Pacific Coast Open tennis tournament and was played on outdoor hard courts at the Round Hill Country Club in Alamo in the San Francisco Bay Area in the United States between September 23 and September 30, 1973. Frew McMillan and  Bob Hewitt were the defending Pacific Coast Championships doubles champions but did not compete together in this edition. Third-seeded Roy Emerson and Stan Smith won the title by defeating unseeded Ove Nils Bengtson and Jim McManus in the final, 6–2, 6–1.

Seeds

Draw

References

External links
 ITF tournament edition details

Tennis in California